Alice Noble Ice Arena is a 900-seat multi-purpose arena in Wooster, Ohio. The 900-seat ice arena features an NHL size ice sheet measuring 200 feet x 85 feet. The arena also features five team locker rooms, concessions, pro shop, and meeting rooms. The arena offers club hockey, high school hockey, figure skating, and open skating opportunities.

Alice M. Noble, the ice arena's namesake, died on November 26, 2010, at the age of 95.

External links
Alice Noble Ice Arena website

Indoor arenas in Ohio
Indoor ice hockey venues in Ohio
Buildings and structures in Wayne County, Ohio